German East Africa (GEA) was a German colony in the African Great Lakes region, which included present-day Burundi, Rwanda, the Tanzania mainland, and the Kionga Triangle, a small region later incorporated into Mozambique.

The colony was organised when the German military was asked in the late 1880s to put down a revolt against the activities of the German East Africa Company. It ended with Imperial Germany's defeat in World War I. Ultimately GEA was divided between Britain, Belgium and Portugal and was reorganised as a mandate of the League of Nations.

History

Like other colonial powers the Germans expanded their empire in the Africa Great Lakes region, ostensibly to fight slavery and the slave trade. Unlike other imperial powers, however they never formally abolished either slavery or the slave trade and preferred instead to curtail the production of new "recruits", regulating the existing business of slavery.

The colony began when Carl Peters, an adventurer and the founder of the Society for German Colonization, signed treaties with several native chieftains on the mainland which is opposite Zanzibar. On 3 March 1885, the German government announced that it had granted an imperial charter, which was signed by Chancellor Otto von Bismarck on 27 February 1885. The charter was granted to Peters' company and was intended to establish a protectorate in the African Great Lakes region. Peters then recruited specialists who began exploring south to the Rufiji River and north to Witu, near Lamu on the coast.

The Sultan of Zanzibar protested and claimed that he was the ruler of both Zanzibar and the mainland. Chancellor Bismarck sent five warships which arrived on 7 August 1885, training their guns on the Sultan's palace. The Sultan was forced to accept the German claims on the mainland outside a 10-mile-strip along the coast. In November 1886 Germany and Britain reached an agreement declaring they would respect the sovereignty of the Sultan of Zanzibar over his islands and the 10-mile-strip along the coast. They otherwise agreed on their spheres of interest along what is now the Tanzanian–Kenyan border The British and Germans agreed to divide the mainland between themselves, and the Sultan had no option but to agree.

German rule was established quickly over Bagamoyo, Dar es Salaam, and Kilwa. Oscar Baumann was sent to explore Masailand and Urundi. During his expedition he discovered the source of the Kagera river, the Alexandra Nile. The caravans of Tom von Prince, Wilhelm Langheld, Emin Pasha, and Charles Stokes were sent to dominate "the Street of Caravans". The Abushiri Revolt of 1888 was put down with British help the following year. In 1890, London and Berlin concluded the Heligoland–Zanzibar Treaty, which gave Heligoland to Germany and decided the border between GEA and the East Africa Protectorate controlled by Britain, although the exact boundaries remained unsurveyed until 1910.

The stretch of border between Kenya and Tanganyika, running from the sea to Lake Victoria, was surveyed by two British brothers: Charles Stewart Smith (British Consul at Mombasa) and his younger brother George Edward Smith (an officer and later a general with the Royal Engineers). Stewart Smith had been appointed British Commissioner in 1892 for the delimitation of the Anglo-German Boundary in Africa, and in the same year they both surveyed the 180-mile line from the sea to Mount Kilimanjaro. Twelve years later George Edward Smith returned to complete the survey of the remaining 300 miles from Kilimanjaro to Lake Victoria.

Between 1891 and 1894, the Hehe people which were led by Chief Mkwawa resisted German expansion. They were defeated because rival tribes supported the Germans. After years of guerrilla warfare, Mkwawa was cornered and committed suicide in 1898.

The Maji Maji Rebellion occurred in 1905 and was put down by Governor Gustav Adolf von Götzen, who ordered measures to create a famine to crush the resistance. It may have cost as many 300,000 lives. Scandal followed with allegations of corruption and brutality. In 1907, Chancellor Bernhard von Bülow appointed Bernhard Dernburg to reform the colonial administration.

German colonial administrators relied heavily on native chiefs to keep order and collect taxes. By 1 January 1914, not including local police, the military garrisons of the Schutztruppen (protective troops) in Dar es Salaam, Moshi, Iringa, and Mahenge numbered 110 German officers (including 42 medical officers), 126 non-commissioned officers, and 2,472 Askari (native enlisted men).

Economic development

Germans promoted commerce and economic growth. Over  were put under sisal cultivation which was the largest cash crop.

Beginning in 1888 the Usambara Railway was built from Tanga to Moshi to bring these agricultural products to market. The Central Railroad covered  and linked Dar es Salaam, Morogoro, Tabora, and Kigoma. The final link to the eastern shore of Lake Tanganyika was completed in July 1914 and was cause for a huge and festive celebration in the capital with an agricultural fair and trade exhibition. Harbor facilities were built or improved with electrical cranes, with rail access and warehouses. Wharves were remodeled at Tanga, Bagamoyo, and Lindi. After 1891, the German colonial administration undertook efforts to overhaul the region's caravan routes, which had existed before European colonisation, into all-weather highways, although most of these projects proved to be unsuccessful and ended in failure.

In 1912, Dar es Salaam and Tanga received 356 freighters and passenger steamers and over 1,000 coastal ships and local trading-vessels. Dar es Salaam became the showcase city of all of tropical Africa. By 1914, Dar es Salaam and the surrounding province had a population of 166,000, among them 1,000 Germans. In all of the GEA, there were 3,579 Germans.

Gold mining in Tanzania in modern times dates back to the German colonial period, beginning with gold discoveries near Lake Victoria in 1894. The Kironda-Goldminen-Gesellschaft established one of the first gold mines in the colony, the Sekenke Gold Mine, which began operation in 1909 after the finding of gold there in 1907.

Education
Germany developed an educational program for Africans that included elementary, secondary, and vocational schools. "Instructor qualifications, curricula, textbooks, teaching materials, all met standards unmatched anywhere in tropical Africa." In 1924, ten years after the beginning of the First World War and six years into British rule, the visiting American Phelps-Stokes Commission reported, "In regards to schools, the Germans have accomplished marvels. Some time must elapse before education attains the standard it had reached under the Germans."

The Swahili word for school, shule, is derived from the German word Schule.

Population on the eve of World War I
In the most populous colony of the German Empire, there were more than 7.5 million locals. About 30% were Muslim and the remainder belonged to various tribal beliefs or Christian converts, compared to around 10,000 Europeans, who resided mainly in coastal locations and official residences. In 1913, only 882 German farmers and planters lived in the colony. Approximately 70,000 Africans worked on the plantations of GEA.

World War I

General Paul von Lettow-Vorbeck had served in German South West Africa and Kamerun. He led the German forces in GEA during World War I. His military consisted of 3,500 Europeans and 12,000 native Askaris and porters. Their war strategy was to harry the British/Imperial army of 40,000, which was at times commanded by the former Second Boer War commander Jan Smuts. One of Lettow-Vorbeck's greatest victories was at the Battle of Tanga (3–5 November 1914). In the battle German forces defeated a British force which was more than eight times larger.

Lettow-Vorbeck's guerrilla warfare compelled Britain to commit significant resources to a minor colonial theatre throughout the war and inflicted more than 10,000 casualties. Eventually the weight of numbers, especially after forces coming from the Belgian Congo had attacked from the west (Battle of Tabora) as well as dwindling supplies forced Lettow-Vorbeck to abandon the colony. He withdrew south into Portuguese Mozambique and then into Northern Rhodesia where he agreed to a ceasefire three days after the end of the war after receiving news of the armistice between the warring nations.

After the war Lettow-Vorbeck was acclaimed as one of Germany's heroes. His Schutztruppe was celebrated as the only colonial German force during World War I that was not defeated in open combat, although they often retreated when outnumbered. The Askari colonial troops that had fought in the East African campaign were later given pension payments by the Weimar Republic and West Germany.

The SMS Königsberg, a German light cruiser, also fought off the coast of the African Great Lakes region. She was eventually scuttled in the Rufiji delta in July 1915 after running low on coal and spare parts and was subsequently blockaded and bombarded by the British. The surviving crew stripped out the remaining ship's guns and mounted them on gun carriages, before joining the land forces which added considerably to their effectiveness.

Another and smaller campaign was conducted on the shores of southern Lake Tanganyika  over 1914–15. It involved a makeshift British and Belgian flotilla, and the Reichsheer garrison at Bismarckburg (modern-day Kasanga).

Break-up of the colony
The Supreme Council of the 1919 Paris Peace Conference awarded all of German East Africa (GEA) to Britain on 7 May 1919, over the strenuous objections of Belgium. The British colonial secretary, Alfred Milner, and Belgium's minister plenipotentiary to the conference, then negotiated the Anglo-Belgian agreement of 30 May 1919 where Britain ceded the north-western GEA districts of Ruanda and Urundi to Belgium. The conference's Commission on Mandates ratified this agreement on 16 July 1919. The Supreme Council accepted the agreement on 7 August 1919.

On 12 July 1919, the Commission on Mandates agreed that the small Kionga Triangle south of the Rovuma River would be given to Portugal; it eventually became part of independent Mozambique. The commission reasoned that Germany had virtually forced Portugal to cede the triangle in 1894.

The Treaty of Versailles was signed on 28 June 1919, although the treaty did not take effect until 10 January 1920. On that date, the GEA was transferred officially to Britain, Belgium, and Portugal. Also on the same day, "Tanganyika" became the name of the British territory.

German placenames
Some names in German East Africa continued to bear German spellings of the local names for a while, such as "Udjidji" for Ujiji and "Kilimandscharo" for Mount Kilimanjaro, "Kleinaruscha" for Arusha-Chini and "Neu-Moschi" for the city now known as Moshi. (Kigoma was known for a time as "Rutschugi".)

Many places were given African names or had their previous names reestablished:

Alt Langenburg (Ikombe)
Bergfrieden (Mibirizi)
Bismarckburg (Kasanga) on the south-eastern end of Lake Tanganyika
Emmaberg (Ilembule)
Fischerstadt (Rombo)
Friedberg (Nyakanazi)
Gottorp or Neu-Gottorp (Uvinza) near the northeastern end of Lake Tanganyika
Hohenfriedeberg (Mlalo)
Hoffnungshöh (Kisarawe)
Kaiseraue (Kazimzumbwi)
Kirondathal (Kirondatal) gold mine 
Langenburg and Neu-Langenburg (Tukuyu) north of Lake Nyasa
Leudorf (Liganga)
Mariahilf (Igulwa)
Marienthal (Ushetu)
Neu-Bethel (Mnazi)
Neu-Bonn (Mikese)
Neu-Hornow (Shume) in the Pare Mountains in the northeast
Neu-Langenburg (Lumbira)
Neu-Trier (Mbulu)
Peterswerft (Nansio)
Sachsenwald (Sekenke) gold mine
St. Moritz (Galula)
Sphinxhafen (Liuli) on the eastern shore of Lake Nyasa
Wiedhafen (Manda) on the eastern shore of Lake Nyasa
Wilhelmstal or Wilhelmsdorf (Lushoto) on the Pangani River in the northeast
Wißmannhafen, port of Bismarckburg (Kasanga) on the southeastern end of Lake Tanganyika

List of governors

The governors of German East Africa:

Administrator (1885-1891)

1885–1888: Carl Peters
1888–1891: Hermann Wissmann

Reichskommissar (1891-1918)
1891–1893: Julius von Soden
1893–1895: Friedrich von Schele
1895–1896: Hermann Wissmann
1896–1901: Eduard von Liebert
1901–1906: Gustav Adolf von Götzen
1906–1912: Albrecht von Rechenberg
1912–1918: Heinrich Schnee

Maps

Gallery

Planned symbols for German East Africa

In 1914, a series of drafts were made for proposed Coat of Arms and Flags for the German Colonies. However World War I broke out before the designs were finished and implemented and the symbols were never actually used. Following its defeat in the war, Germany lost all its colonies and the prepared coat of arms and flags as a result were never used.

See also

List of governors of Tanganyika
List of former German colonies
Chambeshi Monument

References

Further reading
British Foreign Office, Treatment of Natives in the German Colonies, H. M. Stationery Office, London, 1920.
Bullock, A. L. C., Germany's Colonial Demands, Oxford University Press, 1939.
East, John William. "The German Administration in East Africa: A Select Annotated Bibliography of the German Colonial Administration in Tanganyika, Rwanda and Burundi from 1884 to 1918." 294 leaves. Thesis submitted for the fellowship of the Library Association, London, November 1987."
Farwell, Byron. The Great War in Africa, 1914–1918. New York: W. W. Norton & Company. 1989. 
Hahn, Sievers. Afrika. 2nd Edition. Leipzig: Bibliographisches Institut. 1903.
Schnee, Dr. Heinrich (Deputy Governor of German Samoa and last Governor of German East Africa), German Colonization, Past and Future – The Truth about the German Colonies, George Allen & Unwin, London, 1926.

External links

The coins and bank notes of German East Africa
Digitized archive of Deutsch-Ostafrikanische Zeitung (1899–1916) 

German East Africa
Former colonies in Africa
East Africa
East Africa
East Africa
History of German East Africa
Former protectorates
1890s establishments in German East Africa

Treaty of Versailles
1910s disestablishments in German East Africa